The 2006 Asian Wrestling Championships were held in Almaty, Kazakhstan. The event took place from April 4 to April 9, 2006.

Medal table

Team ranking

Medal summary

Men's freestyle

Men's Greco-Roman

Women's freestyle

References
FILA

External links
UWW Database

Asia
W
Asian Wrestling Championships
W